Carmen Iohannis (also spelled Carmen Johannis; née Carmen Georgeta Lăzurcă) (born 2 November 1960) is the wife of Klaus Iohannis, the current President of Romania. She is an English teacher at the Gheorghe Lazăr National College in Sibiu and married Klaus Iohannis in 1989. They have no children. Carmen met her husband when they were both students at the Babeș-Bolyai University. Immediately after graduation, the two were assigned as teachers to Agnita and Sibiu. She was the reason Iohannis chose to stay in Romania when the rest of his family emigrated to Germany in the early 1990s. She is an ethnic Romanian, while her husband is a Transylvanian Saxon.

Carmen Iohannis is the descendant of a Romanian Greek-Catholic family from Sântu, a village near Reghin, Mureș County. During the prohibition of the Romanian Greek Catholic Church by the communist authorities, Carmen attended surreptitious services officiated by Archpriest Pompeiu Onofreiu at his home in Șelarilor Street, services which were also attended by Klaus Iohannis.

Public image
In a ranking conducted by perfecte.ro, Carmen Iohannis figures among the most beautiful and elegant wives of world leaders, alongside Queen Letizia of Spain, Kate Middleton, and Queen Rania of Jordan.

Honours

Foreign honours
: Knight Grand Cross of the Order of Merit of the Italian Republic (5 October 2018)

References

1960 births
Living people
Romanian Greek-Catholics
Romanian schoolteachers
Teachers of English as a second or foreign language
First Ladies of Romania